Sonam Malik (born 15 April 2002) is an Indian woman wrestler from Sonipat, Haryana. She won a gold medal at the National Games, and two gold medals at the World Cadet Wrestling Championship.

Personal life and background 
Malik was born on 15 April 2002 in Madina village of Sonipat, Haryana. Her father and a cousin are wrestlers, who had influence in Malik's decision to pursue the sport. She joined for coaching under coach Ajmer Malik at the Netaji Subhash Chandra Bose Sports Complex in her village. Facilities were inadequate to start with and the coaching academy did not have mats to practice on. The players had to train on the ground, but the ground would turn muddy in rainy days, forcing the players to practice on roads.

In 2017, the wrestler's shoulder was injured in a tournament. The treatment continued for about one-and-half years. In addition to her sports career, Malik is currently pursuing her bachelor of arts degree.

Professional career 

Malik won a gold medal at the National School Games in 2016. In 2017, she won a silver in the Cadet National Championship, a gold in the World School Games, a bronze medal in the Cadet Asian Wrestling Championship and finished with a gold in the Cadet World Wrestling Championship. In 2018, she won bronze medals at the Cadet Asian Wrestling Championship and the Cadet World Wrestling Championship. In 2019, Malik again won the gold medal at the Cadet World Wrestling Championship.

In 2020, she defeated 2016 Rio Olympics bronze medallist Sakshi Malik twice. The first of these came in January in trials for the Asian Championship and later for selection to the Asian Olympic Qualifiers in February.

She won the silver medal in her event at the 2022 World Junior Wrestling Championships held in Sofia, Bulgaria. She competed in the 62 kg event at the 2022 World Wrestling Championships held in Belgrade, Serbia.

References

External links
 

Female sport wrestlers from Haryana
2002 births
Living people
Wrestlers at the 2020 Summer Olympics
Olympic wrestlers of India
21st-century Indian women